Nia Coffey (born June 11, 1995) is an American professional basketball player with the Atlanta Dream of the Women's National Basketball Association (WNBA). A small forward, she was drafted with the fifth overall pick in the 2017 WNBA draft, which is the highest of any Northwestern basketball player in school history.

Coffey went to Hopkins High School in Minnetonka, Minnesota where she was a McDonald's All-American.

She is the daughter of former NBA player, Richard Coffey, and the sister of current NBA player, Amir Coffey.

Career statistics

College

Source

WNBA

Source

Regular season

|-
|-
| style="text-align:left;"| 2017
| style="text-align:left;"| San Antonio
| 27 || 1 || 7.8 || .271 || .000 || .727 || 1.9 || 0.2 || 0.2 || 0.2 || 0.6 || 1.8
|-
| style="text-align:left;"| 2018
| style="text-align:left;"| Las Vegas
| 28 || 10 || 13.8 || .380 || .400 || .618 || 2.4 || 0.6 || 0.3 || 0.2 || 1.4 || 5.3
|-
| style="text-align:left;"| 2019
| style="text-align:left;"| Atlanta
| 28 || 6 || 13.9 || .338 || .379 || .548 || 2.8 || 0.4 || 0.5 || 0.5 || 0.8 || 5.0
|-
| style="text-align:left;"| 2020
| style="text-align:left;"| Phoenix
| 15 || 1 || 15.3 || .421 || .333 || .167 || 2.5 || 0.8 || 0.3 || 0.3 || 0.5 || 2.7
|-
| style="text-align:left;"| 2021
| style="text-align:left;"| Los Angeles
| style="background:#D3D3D3"|32° || 17 || 25.2 || .421 || .417 || .778 || 3.8 || 0.9 || 0.8 || 1.2 || 1.4 || 8.3
|-
| style="text-align:left;"| 2022
| style="text-align:left;"| Atlanta
| 16 || 16 || 21.0 || .347 || .290 || .742 || 5.2 || 0.8 || 0.6 || 0.1 || 2.2 || 6.4
|-
| align="left" | Career
| 6 years, 4 teams
| 146 || 51 || 16.1 || .373 || .377 || .649 || 3.0 || 0.6 || 0.5 || 0.5 || 1.1 || 5.1
|}

References

External links
Northwestern Wildcats bio
USA Basketball bio

1995 births
Living people
American women's basketball players
Atlanta Dream players
Basketball players from Saint Paul, Minnesota
Hopkins High School alumni
Las Vegas Aces players
Los Angeles Sparks players
McDonald's High School All-Americans
Northwestern Wildcats women's basketball players
Phoenix Mercury players
San Antonio Stars draft picks
San Antonio Stars players
Small forwards